Alexandrov (masculine, also written Alexandrow) or Alexandrova (feminine) may refer to:

 Alexandrov (surname) (including Alexandrova), a Slavic last name
 Alexandrov, Vladimir Oblast, Russia
 Alexandrov (inhabited locality), several inhabited localities in Russia
 Alexandrova (horse) (foaled 2003), an Irish thoroughbred racehorse

See also
 Alexandrovsk (disambiguation)